Protactinium(IV) oxide is a chemical compound with the formula PaO2. The black oxide is formed by reducing Pa2O5 with hydrogen at 1 550 °C. Protactinium(IV) oxide does not dissolve in H2SO4, HNO3, or HCl solutions, but reacts with HF.

As protactinium(IV) oxide, like other protactinium compounds, is radioactive, toxic and very rare, it has no known technological use.

References

Oxides
Protactinium compounds
Fluorite crystal structure